BESD may refer to:

 Balsz Elementary School District, Phoenix, Arizona, United States
 Bayshore Elementary School District, San Mateo County, California, United States
 Box Elder School District, Box Elder County, Utah, United States
 Brawley Elementary School District, Brawley, California, United States
 Burlington-Edison School District, Skagit County, Washington, United States